The 1964 European Nations' Cup was the second edition of the UEFA European Championship. The final tournament was held in Spain. It was won by the hosts 2–1 over the defending champions, the Soviet Union.

The tournament was a knockout competition; 29 teams entered (Greece withdrew after the draw after refusing to play Albania). The Soviet Union, Austria and Luxembourg received byes to the round of 16. The teams played home-and-away matches until the semi-finals; the final four teams would move on to the final tournament, whose host was selected after the teams became known.

Luxembourg proved to be the giant-killers of the qualifying rounds; they beat the Netherlands 3–2 on aggregate (1–1 and 2–1), and then drew with Denmark 3–3 and 2–2, before losing the replay 1–0. Denmark thus became the most surprising of the qualifiers for the final tournament, joining the Soviet Union, Spain, and Hungary.

In the semi-finals, the Soviet Union defeated the Danes 3–0 in Barcelona, and Spain beat Hungary 2–1 in extra time in Madrid, the winning goal being scored by Amancio.

This set up a showdown between Spain and the Soviet Union in the final, only four years after Spain had been disqualified for refusing to travel to Moscow to play the Soviet Union. On this occasion – and with the championship of Europe on the line – General Franco let his team play the Soviets. 

In front of more than 79,000 people, including Franco himself, at the Santiago Bernabéu in Madrid, the hosts won 2–1 after a late goal from Marcelino.

Qualification

Qualified teams

Venues

Squads

Match officials

Final tournament

In all matches but the final, extra time and a coin toss were used to decide the winner if necessary. If the final remained level after extra time, a replay would be used to determine the winner.

All times are local, CET (UTC+1).

Bracket

Semi-finals

Third place play-off

Final

Statistics

Goalscorers

Awards
UEFA Team of the Tournament

References

External links

 1964 European Nations' Cup at UEFA.com

 
1964
1963–64 in European football
1963–64 in Spanish football
1964
June 1964 sports events in Europe